The Sweetener World Tour was the fourth concert tour and third arena tour by American singer, songwriter and actress Ariana Grande in support of her fourth and fifth studio albums, Sweetener (2018) and Thank U, Next (2019). Led by Live Nation Entertainment, the tour was officially announced on October 25, 2018. It began on March 18, 2019, at the Times Union Center in Albany, New York, and concluded on December 22, 2019, in Inglewood, California at The Forum, visiting cities in North America and Europe throughout 101 dates. Frequent collaborators and backup dancers of Grande, Brian and Scott Nicholson who were enlisted by her,  served as creative directors and LeRoy Bennett was enlisted as production designer.

The tour was a commercial and critical success - it received positive reviews from critics and fans, who complimented the stage design and Grande's ethereal vocals. The Sweetener World Tour was attended by 1.3 million people and grossed $146.6 million from 97 shows, surpassing her previous concert tour, the Dangerous Woman Tour, as her highest-grossing tour to date. Throughout the tour, Grande partnered with nonprofit organization HeadCount to register new voters ahead of the 2020 United States presidential election, breaking its all-time voter registration record with 33,381 registrations.

Multiple shows across the tour were recorded for the live concert tour album, K Bye for Now (SWT Live). It was released on December 23, 2019, following the final show of the tour in Inglewood, California on December 22, 2019. A concert film documenting the tour entitled Ariana Grande: Excuse Me, I Love You, was released on Netflix on December 21, 2020, one day prior to the one year anniversary of the final show.

Background
 
On May 6, 2018, Grande finally hinted a tour via her official Twitter account, shortly after announcing the title for her upcoming album on The Tonight Show Starring Jimmy Fallon. Three months later, she announced that there were plans for a tour, stating that her team were "workin [sic] on it all now". Grande embarked on a promotional concert tour for Sweetener, The Sweetener Sessions, which began on August 20, 2018, in New York City and ended on September 4, 2018, in London, United Kingdom. Tour passes were also made available via her official website shortly after. Grande announced the title of the tour as the "Sweetener World Tour" on October 24, 2018, announcing its North American dates a day later.

The first leg of the tour had 50 shows across North America and visited 45 cities, beginning on March 18, 2019, in Albany and concluding on August 4, 2019, at Lollapalooza. Pre-sale for the tickets for the first leg of the tour took place between November 1 and November 3, 2018. On November 5, 2018, tickets were opened to the general public, and Grande announced Normani and Social House as her opening acts. On December 10, 2018, due to popular demand, second shows were added in Chicago, Los Angeles, Miami, Brooklyn, New York City, Washington, D.C., Boston, Philadelphia, and Toronto. On January 14, 2019, the shows in Chicago, Indianapolis, Columbus, Milwaukee, St. Louis, Saint Paul, Denver and Salt Lake City were rescheduled and the shows in Omaha and Raleigh were cancelled due to Grande headlining the Coachella Valley Music and Arts Festival on April 14 and April 21, 2019, and a new show was added in Las Vegas. On May 28, 2019, the shows in Tampa and Orlando were cancelled and rescheduled due to illness.

On December 14, 2018, Grande announced the European dates for the tour. A special show was being planned in Manchester. The second leg of the tour had 30 shows and visited 19 cities across Europe, beginning on August 17, 2019, in London and concluded on October 16, 2019, in London. Pre-sale for the tickets for the second leg of the tour took place between December 19 and December 21, 2018, for the United Kingdom, and between December 18 and December 20, 2018, for all other dates. On December 20, 2018, tickets were opened to the general public (excluding the United Kingdom), and due to popular demand, additional shows were added in Amsterdam, Paris and Dublin. On December 21, 2018, tickets were opened to the general public in the United Kingdom, and due to popular demand, additional shows were added in London and Birmingham. On February 25, 2019, due to popular demand, additional shows were added in Hamburg and Dublin. On March 5, 2019, Grande announced that Ella Mai would be the opening act for the European leg of the tour. On June 11, 2019, due to popular demand, additional shows were added in London. On August 9, 2019, the first show in Hamburg and the show in Prague were rescheduled, and the show in Kraków was cancelled.

On June 20, 2019, Grande announced another North American leg of the tour. The third leg of the tour visited 18 cities and had  20 shows across the United States, including the rescheduled Tampa and Orlando shows, beginning on November 9, 2019, in Uniondale and concluding on December 22, 2019, in Inglewood. Pre-sale for the tickets for the third leg of the tour took place between June 26 and June 30, 2019. On July 1, 2019, tickets were opened to the general public. On July 11, 2019, due to popular and high demand, additional shows were added in San Francisco and Inglewood.

Grande announced she would be partnering with nonprofit voter registration group HeadCount to register new voters ahead of the 2020 presidential election in March via Instagram. She encouraged fans to "use your voice and get your 'thank u, next gen' sticker." In July, it was reported that HeadCount registered twice as many voters in partnership with Grande than any other tour over the last three years and that the Sweetener World Tour was the most successful artist tour for voter registration HeadCount has seen since 2008. In December, it was announced that the tour broke the organization's all-time record, with 33,381 voter registrations and actions.

Stage and aesthetic 
Grande wore costumes from Versace and Michael Ngo on stage. She enlisted Brian and Scott Nicholson as creative directors,  LeRoy Bennett as production designer, and Jason Baeri as lighting director. Designed based on the idea of a sphere, the tour stage was intended to deliver an abstract and "ethereal" aesthetic. It included a semicircular runway that looped around an audience pit, a large screen at the back with a hemisphere-like projection, and a large orb—nicknamed "the moon" by fans and Grande herself—that descended briefly as Grande sang on the B-stage in the middle of the pit. The moon and the projection screen were both inflatable, requiring a set-up period of six to eight hours, although Grande's team assembled everything in 45 minutes for her Coachella set. Bennett likened the show's feel more to a play than to a pop show: "Usually you are trying to appropriately match the energy of a song with action and accent to tell a story along with the music and lyrics; the language of this show was different in that we were striving to create static tableaus and grand gestures as an environment for her to play in front of, much like a unit set in a play."

Critical reception
 

The tour has received positive reviews from critics. Brittany Spanos from Rolling Stone gave the opening night at Albany a positive review, stating that "Grande's new world tour is full of emotional drama, iconic looks, and undeniable hits". Spanos also commented on Grande's looks, stating that "fewer and fewer young stars today have the kind of distinctive aesthetic that can be reproduced en masse by fans, but Grande has dedicated years to perfecting how she has presented herself. In 2019, it seems the world has finally caught up to her. Or, as her frequent collaborator and friend Nicki Minaj predicted on “Side to Side” three years ago: “Ariana run pop." Chris Richards of the Washington Post gave a positive review to Grande's show in Washington D.C, stating that "Ariana Grande reached the height of her fame by making heavy feel light". He praised her vocals stating that "Grande's voice is equal parts breathy and acrobatic, and she knows how to hit a big note like she's whispering it". Chris Willman of Variety praised Grande's two night show at the Staples Center in Los Angeles, calling the show "giddy, splendorous, beautifully designed, expertly performed and almost a little bit avant-garde in its staging". He also stated that it was "much more than at Coachella, her visually experimental Staples stop was revealed as a thing of inventive beauty, not to mention expertly sung fun."

The second leg of the tour in Europe has also received positive reviews. Adam White of The Telegraph gave the show a 5 out of 5 stars, stating that the show was "a night of magic and melancholy from the most exciting young star in pop". Cydney Yeates of Metro gave the show 4 out of 5 stars, stating that "there's nothing more to say now besides God*is*a woman and her name is Ariana Grande." Hannah Mylrea of NME noted that "the production was fairly understated, putting the full focus on her impressive vocals, but there were moments of impressive choreography".

Grande's headlining performance at the 2019 Coachella Valley Music and Arts Festival was praised by critics, with many praising her vocals, visuals, and guest appearances, particularly the appearance of NSYNC. Shad Powers of USA Today stated that "Grande closed out Weekend One of Coachella in style, putting together a set that included special guests, stunning visuals, and of course her undeniable voice." Rhian Daly of NME called her set "a breathtaking moment of light in a dark world". She also stated that, after the end of the set, "the feeling was already mutual long before Grande took to the stage but [...] its foundations are more solid than ever". In another positive review, Ben Beaumont-Thomas of The Guardian stated that "with her headline set surveying her entire career, [Grande's] work forms a fascinating, still-unfolding pop Bildungsroman: every sexual epiphany and personal milestone sketched out in real time, resulting in a uniquely involving opus. You can see why she is such an icon to a generation who also tell their own stories in public, via Snapchat and Instagram." Claire Shaffer from Rolling Stone stated that "Grande gave a star-studded headlining performance", naming NSYNC's guest appearance as one of the best moments of the 2019 Coachella. Suzy Exposito continued, "Grande became one of the boys that night, claiming Timberlake’s verses from the center stage and whipping her lustrous, anime pony like a boss." Lyndsey Havens of Billboard called Grande's set "epic" and stated that she "continues to rewrite the rule book for pop stardom and admittedly fosters a new relationship with herself." She praised Grande's collaboration with NSYNC, stating "all together with Grande, they delivered well-practiced choreography, sang the track she samples with her filling in for Timberlake and finally ended with "Tearin' Up My Heart."

Commercial performance
The Sweetener World Tour grossed over $146.4 million with 1.3 million tickets sold. It surpassed her previous tour, the Dangerous Woman Tour (which grossed $71.1) as her best-grossing and biggest tour to date. The tour grossed $106.9 million in the U.S. and Canada and $39.5 million in Europe. Overall, Grande's total tour figures extend to $243.5 million with 2.7 million tickets sold from 229 shows. Due to high demand, seconds shows were added in Boston, Washington D.C., Philadelphia, Toronto, Los Angeles, Phoenix, Dallas,  Miami, Chicago, Atlanta, Nashville, Brooklyn (another show would be added later on), New York City, London (4 more shows were added later on), Amsterdam (another show would be added), Paris, Birmingham, Hamburg, Dublin (two more shows would be added), San Francisco, and Inglewood.

Set list
This set list is representative of the first show in Albany, performed in March 18, 2019. It does not represent all concerts for the duration of the tour.

"Raindrops (An Angel Cried)"
"God Is a Woman"
"Bad Idea”
"Break Up with Your Girlfriend, I'm Bored"
"R.E.M."
"Be Alright"
"Sweetener"
"Successful"
"Side to Side"
"Bloodline"
"7 Rings"
"Love Me Harder"/"Breathin"
"Needy"
"Fake Smile"
"Make Up"
"Right There"/"You'll Never Know"/"Break Your Heart Right Back"
"NASA"
"Goodnight n Go"
"Everytime"
"One Last Time"
"The Light Is Coming"
"Into You"
"Dangerous Woman"
"Break Free"
"No Tears Left to Cry"
"Thank U, Next"

Shows

Cancelled shows

Notes

References

External links
 

2019 concert tours
Ariana Grande concert tours